"These Days" is a song by American rock band Bon Jovi. It was released in February 26, 1996, as the fourth single from their sixth studio album, These Days (1995).

Background
"These Days" showcases the darker tone that Jon Bon Jovi and Richie Sambora’s lyrics sought to achieve with the album. The song which begins with a haunting piano progression, deals with homelessness, loss of innocence and the difficulty of keeping up a relationship in the modern age. It is about people out there trying to be understood, to live their dreams. The single peaked at number seven in the United Kingdom and reached the top-10 in Lithuania.

Track listings

Australasian CD single
 "These Days" (edit) – 4:29
 "634-5789" – 3:08
 "(It's Hard) Letting You Go" (live) – 6:45
 "Rocking in the Free World" (live) – 5:53

UK CD1
 "These Days" (edit) – 4:31
 "Someday I'll Be Saturday Night" – 4:38
 "These Days" (live) – 5:57
 "Helter Skelter" (live) – 3:20

UK CD2
 "These Days" (edit) – 4:31
 "634-5789" – 3:08
 "Rocking in the Free World" (live) – 5:53
 "(It's Hard) Letting You Go" (live) – 6:45

UK cassette single and European CD single
 "These Days" (edit) – 4:31
 "634-5789" – 3:08

Japanese CD1
 "These Days" (edit)
 "(It's Hard) Letting You Go" (live)
 "Rocking in the Free World" (live)
 "Helter Skelter" (live)
 "Hey God" (live)
 "These Days" (live)

Japanese CD2
 "These Days" – 6:27
 "The End" (demo) – 3:40
 "When She Comes" (demo) – 3:28
 "Lonely at the Top" (demo) – 4:17

Charts

References

Bon Jovi songs
1995 songs
1996 singles
Song recordings produced by Peter Collins (record producer)
Songs written by Jon Bon Jovi
Songs written by Richie Sambora